Kathleen Wilcoxson is an American politician from Oklahoma. Wilcoxson represented Oklahoma State Senate District 45 from 1996 to 2008, serving the twelve years allowed under term limits.

Early life and career
Wilcoxson grew up in Owasso, Oklahoma. She graduated from Southwestern Oklahoma State University with a bachelor's degree in elementary education. She then attended Oklahoma State University where she earned both her master's degree in special education and doctorate degree in curriculum and instruction. Wilcoxson began to teach in 1970. She was appointed by President Ronald Reagan to the National Advisory Council on Adult Basic Education in 1982 where she served four years. In 1990, Wilcoxson was selected as Oklahoma City Teacher of the Year. After her retirement from the Senate she returned to the classroom, teaching elementary school in the Western Heights School District.

Oklahoma Senate
During her time in the legislature, Wilcoxson served as Co-Chair of the Education Committee. She is a strong proponent of Oklahoma implementing a voucher program for students.

Senate Committees
 Education (Co-Chair)
 Appropriations Subcommittee on Education
 Criminal Jurisprudence
 Finance
 Health and Human Resources

Other Involvements
Aside from her career in education and time as a public representative, Wilcoxson was involved in numerous organizations, including:
Member of the Moore, Mustang, and South Oklahoma City Chambers of Commerce
Board of Trustees for the Oklahoma Foundation for Excellence
American Business Women’s Association
 Republican Women’s Club

References

External links
 2005-2006 Oklahoma Almanac Online--Oklahoma History
 Women of the Oklahoma Legislature Oral History Project--OSU Library

Year of birth missing (living people)
Living people
People from Lawton, Oklahoma
Southwestern Oklahoma State University alumni
Oklahoma State University alumni
Women state legislators in Oklahoma
Republican Party Oklahoma state senators
21st-century American politicians
21st-century American women politicians